Senator Conner may refer to:

Alexander H. Conner (1831–1891), Nebraska State Senate
Henry Conner (1837–after 1916), Wisconsin State Senate
Pat Conner (fl. 1990s), Arizona State Senate

See also
Senator Connor (disambiguation)